Jason Hoffman (born 28 January 1989) is an Australian association football player who plays as a right back for the Newcastle Jets in the A-League.Jason is the most capped player in Newcastle Jets History. 
Jason’s nickname is “the Hoff”.

Club career

Hoffman was developed through NSWIS and Hamilton Olympic Warriors FC. He started as trainee at the Newcastle Jets and became a part of the first team squad.

On 2 September 2007 he made his A-League debut for the Jets as a substitute in Round 2 of the 2007–08 season, and scored his first goal for the club in Matchday 6 of the Asian Champions League against Ulsan Hyundai.

Hoffman broke his 20 match goal drought in the A-League by scoring twice in the first half of the Jets 09/10 season opener against the Wellington Phoenix.

On 8 January 2010, he signed a two-year deal with Melbourne Heart.

After being released by Melbourne City in 2015, Hoffman returned to the Newcastle Jets on a one-year deal. He started in 25 of Newcastle's 27 league games that season and signed a two-year contract extension upon the conclusion of the 2015–16 A-League season.

In Round 24 of the 2017–18 A-League season Hoffman played his 100th A-League game for Newcastle but was sent off in the 78th Minute.

Known as something of a utility player, Hoffman began Newcastle's 2018–19 campaign as the club's center forward due to the 10-game ban of Roy O'Donovan that he incurred in the previous season's Grand Final. He started the first six games of the season and scored one goal, coming in a 2–0 win away to Western Sydney on 23 November, earning the club their first win of the season. Not fit for the game against Brisbane on 9 December, Hoffman returned the following week as a first half substitute at left-back for Ivan Vujica in their 2–0 defeat to league-leaders Perth. Hoffman remained in the side ahead of Vujica in Ernie Merrick's defense for their next game, the F3 Derby against Central Coast on 23 December. He leveled the score with a header in the second half and had a second header ruled out for offside as Newcastle would go on to win 2–1 through Ronald Vargas.

Honours
With Australia:
 Weifang Cup (U-18): 2007
With Newcastle Jets:
 A-League Championship: 2007–2008

References

External links
 Melbourne Heart profile
 FFA – Young Socceroos profile

1989 births
Living people
Australian soccer players
A-League Men players
Newcastle Jets FC players
Melbourne City FC players
Sportspeople from Newcastle, New South Wales
Australian Institute of Sport soccer players
New South Wales Institute of Sport alumni
Association football fullbacks